Kildorrery GAA is a Gaelic Athletic Association based in the parish of Kildorrery, Cork, Ireland. The club fields teams in competitions organized by the Cork GAA county board and the Avondhu GAA divisional board. The club fields teams in both hurling and Gaelic football.

Achievements
 Munster Junior Club Hurling Championship Winners (1) 2012
 Cork Intermediate Football Championship Winners (1) 1981
 Cork Intermediate A Football Championship Runner-Up 2008, 2010
 Cork Intermediate Hurling Championship Runners-Up 2016
 Cork Junior Football Championship Winners (1) 1978  Runners-Up 2007
 Cork Junior Hurling Championship Winners (1) 2012  Runner-Up 1972
 Cork Minor A Football Championship Runner-Up 2000
 Cork Minor B Football Championship Runner-Up 1997
 Cork Under-21 B Football Championship Runner-Up 2012
 North Cork Junior A Hurling Championship Winners (9) 1962, 1963, 1969, 1972, 1973, 1977, 1984, 1988, 2012  Runners-Up 1961, 1968, 1975, 1978, 2011
 North Cork Junior A Football Championship Winners (4) 1978, 1990, 1994, 2007  Runners-Up 1974, 1975, 1986, 1989,

References

External sources
Kildorrery GAA website

Gaelic games clubs in County Cork
Gaelic football clubs in County Cork
Hurling clubs in County Cork
1949 establishments in Ireland
Gaelic Athletic Association clubs established in 1949